The Liffey Falls, a series of four distinct tieredcascade waterfalls on the Liffey River, is located in the Midlands region of Tasmania, Australia. The falls are a significant massacre site where 30-60 Aboriginal people were murdered in a reprisal killing for the killing of the stockman William Knight by Aboriginal people.

Location and features
The Liffey Falls are situated upstream of the town of Liffey, in Meander Valley, accessible from  via the Lake Highway. Each of the tiered cascades is named in order from upstream to downstream; Alexandra Falls, Hopetoun Falls, The Leap or Spout Falls (also called the Albert Falls), and Victoria Falls.

Walking tracks lead to the falls from both upstream (tourist carpark), and downstream.

Ethnology-history of the area
The area surrounding Liffey Falls was a meeting place for Tasmanian Aboriginal peoples for thousands of years prior to the colonisation of Australia. The Liffey River was originally called Tellerpangger by the Panninher clan who occupied the area.

Liffey Falls Massacre 
In 1827 a significant massacre of up to sixty of the Pallittorre clan by European colonists took place during the Black War.
The massacre with sixty dead or wounded is reported in The Sydney Morning Herald as happening at Liffey Falls. Colonial Times and Tasmanian Advertiser reporting on 6 July 1827 (page 4, The Natives) on a dispatch from Launceston does not explicitly mention Liffey Falls and refers to Quamby's Bluff when it notes:

Gallery

See also

 List of waterfalls of Tasmania

References

External links 
Tasmania Parks and Wildlife Service - Liffey Falls State Reserve
Tasmania Parks and Wildlife Service - Liffey Falls Walk

Waterfalls of Tasmania
Midlands (Tasmania)
Cascade waterfalls
Tiered waterfalls
Meander Valley Council